Nantong West railway station (Chinese: 南通西站) is a railway station in Tongzhou District, Nantong, Jiangsu, China.

History
This station opened with the Shanghai–Suzhou–Nantong railway on 1 July 2020.

Future
The under construction Nantong–Ningbo high-speed railway will include a stop here.

Metro station
Nantong Metro Line 1 has opened and will serve this station since 10 November 2022

See also
Nantong railway station

References

Railway stations in Jiangsu
Railway stations in China opened in 2020